Hrytsay is a surname. Notable people with the surname include:

Oleksandr Hrytsay (born 1977), Ukrainian footballer
Vitaliy Hrytsay (born 1991), Ukrainian footballer